The Fokker D.V (Fokker designation M.22) was a German biplane fighter of World War I.

Design and development
After the disappointing performance of his D.I through D.IV, Fokker resolved to produce a smaller, lighter rotary-powered design. The new prototype, designated M.21, was a development of the earlier M.17 fighter which Fokker had produced for the Austro-Hungarian Air Service. The M.21 featured a swept back upper wing to improve pilot view.

Fokker was enthusiastic about the new aircraft, which was highly maneuverable. After the addition of a modified cowling and stringers along the fuselage sides, the aircraft was designated M.22. In October 1916, Idflieg ordered the M.22 into production as the D.V.

Operational history
Deliveries commenced in January 1917. Due to the low-compression Oberursel U.I, the D.V offered poor performance compared to the Albatros fighters. The D.V saw little active service and most aircraft were relegated to fighter training schools. When the Fokker Dr.I entered service in late 1917, small numbers of D.V aircraft were issued to squadrons for use as conversion trainers.

Production of the D.V totaled 216 aircraft.

Specifications

References

Bibliography

 Gray, Peter and Owen Thetford. German Aircraft of the First World War. London: Putnam, 1962. 
 Leaman, Paul. Fokker Dr.I Triplane: A World War One Legend. Hersham, Surrey, UK: Classic Publications, 2003. .
 Weyl, A.R. Fokker: The Creative Years. London: Putnam, 1988. .

1910s German fighter aircraft
D 05
Rotary-engined aircraft
Biplanes
Aircraft first flown in 1917

de:Fokker D.I-V